Bruno "Red" Canzian (born 30 November 1951 in Quinto di Treviso, Italy) is a songwriter, lead vocalist and bassist of the Italian band Pooh.

Discography 
Io e Red (1986)
L'istinto e le stelle (2014)
Testimone del Tempo (2018)

Singles
"Rosso Natale" (1986)
"Il calcio del sorriso" (1998)
"Anima Bianco Verde" (2007)

Bibliography
Magia dell'albero (1992)
Storie di vita e di fiori (1996)
Ho visto sessanta volte fiorire il calicanto (2012)

Appearances
 1990: Uomini soli (1st')

References

External links

1951 births
Living people
Italian songwriters
Male songwriters
Masked Singer winners